The Blue Orange Theatre is an independent theatre located in the Jewellery Quarter in the centre of Birmingham, England. It was founded by the local producer and director Mark Webster and opened in April 2011, aiming to showcase new drama and writing from the city.

The main auditorium is a 107-seat theatre, with the site also including a bar and a rehearsal studio. The theatre acts as a producing theatre staging work by its own company, as well as hosting performances from visiting theatre companies.

References

External links
 

Theatres in Birmingham, West Midlands
Theatre companies in Birmingham, West Midlands
2011 establishments in England
Producing theatres in England